Lambert Reynst (1613–1679) was a Dutch regent and politician of the Golden Age. Born in Amsterdam, he belonged to the "republican" Dutch States Party.

Family
He came from the patrician Reynst family and was the son of Hendrick Reynst and his wife Elisabeth Prinsen. He was also a cousin of the Grand Pensionary Johan de Witt and brother in Law of Cornelis de Graeff and his brother Andries de Graeff, with whom he sat together in the Amsterdam Vroedschap during the Rampjaar 1672. Lambert himself married Alida, daughter of Cornelis Bicker and Aertge Witsen.

Life
Reynst worked as a lawyer and between 1649 and 1655 was a counsellor for the Dutch Admiralty in the Noorderkwartier. The family lived on Keizersgracht 71. In 1667 he became a 'bewindhebber' or governor of the Dutch East India Company and was made mayor of Amsterdam in 1667, 1668 and 1672. As mayor, he held a reception for Cosimo III de' Medici at the Van Campen Theatre.

When the Dutch Republic was attacked by Britain and France in the 'rampjaar' of 1672, the Dutch people turned to Johan de Witt and his brother Cornelis. After the death of both brothers and the rise of William III of Orange as stadtholder, Reynst, his brother-in-law Andries de Graeff, his cousins Pieter, Jacob de Graeff and Hans Bontemantel and nine others were dismissed. Reynst's successor as mayor was Johannes Hudde.

Between 1667 and 1672 Reynst was 'ambachtsheer' of Amstelveen and Nieuwer-Amstel. Reynst's housekeeper was Eeltien Vinck, who in 1668 married the painter Meindert Hobbema; the same year Hobbema obtained a job with the city council, and reduced his painting. Aernout van Overbeke, a 17th-century humorist, described Reynst as the city's greatest "hoerenjager" (literally, whore-hunter), which could mean one who frequented prostitutes or one who prosecuted them. He died in Amsterdam.

References

Sources

Mayors of Amsterdam
Administrators of the Dutch East India Company
17th-century Dutch people
1613 births
1679 deaths